Like Water may refer to:

 Anderson Silva: Like Water, a documentary about Brazilian mixed martial artist Anderson Silva
 "Like Water" (Ladi6 song), a 2011 single by Ladi6
 Like Water (EP), a 2021 EP by South Korean singer Wendy
 "Like Water" (Wendy song), the title track from the EP
 Like Water (novel), a 2017 novel by Rebecca Podos

See also

 Jeet Kune Do, the martial art of being like water
 Be Like Water, a 2008 play
 
 Like (disambiguation)
 Water (disambiguation)